Dinophalia is a genus of moths belonging to the family Tortricidae.

Species
Dinophalia egregia Razowski & Becker, 1993

See also
List of Tortricidae genera

References

 , 2005: World catalogue of insects volume 5 Tortricidae.
 , 2011: Diagnoses and remarks on genera of Tortricidae, 2: Cochylini (Lepidoptera: Tortricidae). Shilap Revista de Lepidopterologia 39 (156): 397–414.
 , 1993, Shilap Revista de Lepodopterologia 21: 234

External links
tortricidae.com

Cochylini
Tortricidae genera